Garfield North is a bounded rural locality in Victoria, Australia, 68 km south-east of Melbourne's Central Business District, located within the Shire of Cardinia local government area. Garfield North recorded a population of 236 at the 2021 census.

See also
 Shire of Pakenham – Garfield North was previously within this former local government area.

References

Shire of Cardinia